Astral is a shoegaze group based in San Francisco, California, United States.  Astral was formed by singer-guitarist Dave Han and drummer Shawn in 1999; bassist Amy Rosenoff joined them in 2001.  Their vocals are frequently compared to those of The Cure; other influences include My Bloody Valentine and Joy Division. Their music is of an ethereal, melodic nature; this ambient sound is created largely by heavy use of distortion and feedback effects in Han's guitar.  Astral are also notable for incorporating improvisation into their live performances. In 2002, Astral released a self-produced EP, "Only Sometimes".  In 2003, Astral released an LP, entitled "Orchids".  Two songs from that album, "Raining Down" and the title-track instrumental, were preloaded in the Rio Carbon MP3 Players.  In 2008 the band released their second album Sleepwalker.

Current lineup
 Dave Han – Vocals, Guitars
 Gary Hews – Bass
 Mark Shriver – Drums

Original lineup
 Dave Han – Vocals, Guitars
 Shawn Nakano – Drums, Percussion
 Amy Rosenoff – Bass

Discography
Only Sometimes (EP) 2002
Second Stitch (EP) 2002
Orchids 2003
Transmitter (EP) April 2007
"Turn Me Around" (7" single) 2002
Sleepwalker 2007
"A Lullaby from Amsterdam" (7" single) 2008
Excerpts from Down the Rabbit Hole (EP) 2010
Forever After 2010

References

External links
Official Website
 Myspace

Dream pop musical groups
Musical groups established in 1999
1999 establishments in California